The 2008 Paris Motor Show took place from 4 October to 19 October 2008, in Paris expo Porte de Versailles.

This edition of the Paris Motor Show featured a high number of hybrid and electric vehicles (EVs), that led a blogger with The New York Times to ask, "Who killed the non-electric cars?".

Concept cars

 Audi A1 Sportback
 BMW X1 (E84)
 BMW 7 Series ActiveHybrid
 Chevrolet Orlando
 GT by Citroën
 Citroën C-Cactus Hybrid
 Citroën Hypnos
 Honda Insight
 LADA Revolution III
 Lamborghini Estoque
 Lexus LF-Xh
 Maserati GranTurismo MC

 Mazda Kiyora
 Mercedes-Benz ConceptFASCINATION
 MINI Crossover
 Nissan Nuvu
 Optimal Joule
 Peugeot Prologue
 Peugeot RC
 Pininfarina B0
 Renault Ondelios
 Renault Z.E.
 Saab 9-X Air BioHybrid
 SsangYong C200

Production cars

 Aston Martin One-77
 Audi RS6
 Audi S4
 Bentley Arnage Final Edition
 BMW 3 Series E90 mid-life refresh
 BMW 7 Series F01
 Cadillac CTS Sport Wagon
 Chevrolet Cruze
 Chevrolet Volt (European, auto show introduction)
 Citroën C3 Picasso (introduced as the "Drooneel" concept car)
 Dacia Logan MCV facelift
 Dacia Logan eco2
 Dacia Sandero
 Ferrari California
 Fiat 500 Abarth SS
 Ford Fiesta Panel Van
 Ford Ka Mk II
 Ford Kuga Individual
 Hyundai i20
 Infiniti EX37
 Infiniti FX37
 Kia Soul
 Lexus IS 250C/350C convertible
 Lumeneo SMERA (battery electric quadricycle)
 Mazda MX-5 mid-life facelift

 Mercedes-Benz S400 BlueHybrid
 Mitsubishi Lancer Sportback
 Nissan Note
 Nissan Pixo
 Opel Insignia
 Peugeot 308 CC
 Peugeot 407 restyle
 PGO Hemera
 Porsche 911 Targa (update)
 Porsche Boxster S Porsche Design Edition 2
 Porsche Cayenne S Transsyberia
 Porsche Cayman S Sport
 Renault Kangoo II Be Bop
 Renault Laguna III Coupe
 Renault Mégane Mk III
 SEAT Exeo
 Smart Fortwo ED (Electric Drive)
 Subaru Forester (European diesel introduction)
 Suzuki Alto
 Suzuki SX4 FCV
 Škoda Octavia, Mk II restyle
 Toyota Avensis
 Toyota iQ
 Toyota Urban Cruiser
 Volkswagen Golf 6
 Volvo C30/S40/V50 1.6D DRIVe

Motorsport cars

 Citroën C4 WRC Hymotion 4 (Eco-Concept)
 Peugeot 207 WRC
 Suzuki SX4 WRC

Taxis du Monde

As usual, Hall 8 hosted a special exhibition. In this edition, the subject was "Taxis du Monde" (Taxis from around the world), and it featured a variety of taxi vehicles from different cities and eras, such as a New York checker cab, a Chicago yellow cab, London black cabs, a Manila Jeepney, a Bangkok Tuk Tuk, etc., as well as several Parisian taxis, starting with the classic Renault Taxi de la Marne and ending with the proposed future taxi Peugeot Expert Tepee.

See also
 Paris Motor Show

References

 http://apps1.eere.energy.gov/news/enn.cfm#id_12040

External links

Official web site
9 Sexiest Electric Cars from the Paris Auto Show.

Auto shows in France
Paris Motor Show
Motor Show
Events in Paris
Paris Motor Show